was a Japanese physician during the first half of the 20th century, a major general in the Imperial Japanese Army, and a war criminal.

Biography
Satō was a native of the city of Toyohashi in Aichi Prefecture.

From January 1941 he was a department head within the Epidemic Prevention and Water Purification Department under the Japanese Central China Area Army.  While the public mission of this department was to prevent the spread of disease and monitor water supply, it was also assigned the mission of manufacturing and testing biological weapons. In August, he was promoted to colonel and from November 1941 commanded Unit 8604 of the Japanese Southern China Area Army, a biological warfare unit that operated in southern China.  From March 1944, he was reassigned as Chief of Medical Service of the IJA 5th Army based in Manchukuo. He was promoted to major general in June 1945.

Captured by the Red Army during the Soviet invasion of Manchuria, he was accused of war crimes and sentenced to 20 years' incarceration in the Khabarovsk War Crime Trials. However, in 1956, with the restoration of diplomatic relations between Japan and the Soviet Union, he was repatriated to Japan.  He died in 1977.

References

External links
 

1896 births
1977 deaths
Military personnel from Aichi Prefecture
Imperial Japanese Army generals of World War II
Japanese military doctors
Japanese biological weapons program
Siberian internees
Members of the Kwantung Army
Japanese people convicted of war crimes